Ericeia eriophora is a moth in the  family Erebidae. It is found from the Oriental tropics to the Philippines and Sulawesi.

Adults exhibit sexual dimorphism, with a broadly darkened submarginal zone in males, while this darkening is limited to the apical area in females, which are also browner.

References

Moths described in 1852
Ericeia